"Pumping (My Heart)" is a rock song written by Patti Smith, Ivan Král and Jay Dee Daugherty, and released as a second single from Patti Smith Group 1976 album Radio Ethiopia. In 1989 the song was covered by Dramarama on their album Box Office Bomb.

Notes 

1976 singles
Arista Records singles
Patti Smith songs
Songs written by Ivan Kral
Songs written by Patti Smith
Song recordings produced by Jack Douglas (record producer)